Logooli (alternate names: Lugooli, Llugule, Llogole, Luragoli, Uluragooli, Maragooli, Maragoli, or Ragoli; native name: Lulogooli) is a Bantu language with several hundred thousand speakers in Kenya and a few hundred speakers in Mara Region, Tanzania. It is spoken by the Maragoli, the second-largest Luhya tribe, but is not particularly close to other languages spoken by the Luhya.

See also 
 Great Lakes Bantu languages

References

Languages of Kenya

Luhya language

Great Lakes Bantu languages